Maria van Antwerpen (1719–1781) was a Dutch soldier and cross dresser. She is perhaps the most famous and well-documented example of a female cross dresser enlisting in the army as a man. She is considered by the Dutch historians Rudolf Dekker and L.J.M. van de Pol as a transsexual woman. Maria married twice to women. Two biographies were published about Maria in her own lifetime, one by Franciscus Lievens Kersteman in 1751.

Life
Van Antwerpen was born in Breda, the daughter of a brewer. She was orphaned at thirteen and worked as a servant maid until she was fired in the middle of winter in 1745. She enlisted in the military as Jan van Ant in 1746 and married the sergeant daughter Johanna Cramers in 1748. Recognised by a former employer in 1751, she was put on trial for making a mockery of marriage and by entering an illegal marriage, and sentenced to exile from all garrison cities. She worked as a seamstress until 1762, when she married Cornelia Swartsenberg, pregnant after a rape, and enlisted again. A son was baptised with her as a father. In 1769, she was recognised by someone who knew her as a seamstress, and put on trial again. Cornelia fled and Maria was exiled to the area of Holland. She died in Breda at the age of 62.

Context
Other examples of Dutch women posing as men include Adriana la Noy, who served as a sailor in the Dutch fleet during the first English–Dutch war when she was discovered in 1653, Aal de Dragonder (Aal the Dragoon), a woman who fought as a dragoon in the late 17th century, and an unnamed woman, also a soldier, who was discovered after having been killed in a fight with knives in 1710.

See also
 List of Dutch people

Sources
Isa Edholm: Kvinnohistoria, Alfabeta Bokförlag AB, Stockholm, Falun 2001. . 
Antwerpen, Maria van, Instituut voor Nederlandse Geschiedenis 
Rudolf Dekker & Lotte van de Pol. Vrouwen in mannenkleren; De geschiedenis van een tegendraadse traditie; Europa 1500-1800. Amsterdam, Wereldbibliotheek, 1989.

References

1719 births
1781 deaths
18th-century Dutch military personnel
Female wartime cross-dressers
Dutch lesbians
Lesbian military personnel
People from Breda
18th-century LGBT people
Women in 18th-century warfare
Women in war in the Netherlands
Same-sex marriage in the Netherlands